Click is a 2010 Indian Hindi-language supernatural horror film directed by Sangeeth Sivan and starring Shreyas Talpade, Sadha Sayed, Sneha Ullal, Rehan Khan, and Chunky Pandey.

Plot
Avinash “Avi” Mehra is an ace photographer who is in a live-in relationship with Sonia, a model. One night while returning from a party, the couple accidentally hit a young girl with their speeding car. As Sonia was driving the car, to avoid further complications, Avi insists on them fleeing from the accident scene. But trouble starts for the couple soon after. While strange white marks begin to appear in Avi's photos, Sonia starts having spooky experiences. Avi also develops a severe neck pain and even though he does not appear to be overweight, a scale reveals that he weighs 120 kilograms (264.6 pounds). Avi, too, starts having experiences similar to Sonia's.
The couple is petrified when all of Avi's best friends commit suicide in a similar manner. It then comes to light that the spirit haunting them all has a connection to Avi's college life. Meanwhile, Sonia finds out that Avi was friends with a girl named Aarti Kaushik during his college days. As Avi and Sonia are still being haunted by Aarti they go and visit her, but realize that Aarti is dead, having apparently committed suicide by using a knife. Aarti's mother believes that she is still alive, thinking that she is merely ill and will recover.
On the way home Aarti continues to haunt Avi and Sonia, and again during the night at the hotel she also haunts Avi in his sleep, ending up with him being thrown off the fire escape.

Later Avi is in the hospital and Sonia tells him that Aarti will be cremated, and they visit her funeral before returning to their home town. Sonia finds some photos of Aarti, where she is crawling to get something. As she follows the pattern indicated by Aarti, Sonia discovers that Avi's best friends (who later committed suicide) are raping Aarti.
When Sonia talks to Avi about this dark secret, he tells her that he only wanted Aarti to understand his feelings, but that when his best friends tried to talk to her, Aarti hurt Avi's friend Tarun, who became angry and with his friends raped her. Avi claims that when he entered the room he was shocked at the scene and tried to help her, but that Tarun then said that Avi had asked them to rape her as a way of avoiding jail, and accused Avi of planning to do this to her and having one of Avi's friends taking the pictures.
Avi then tells Sonia that the reason he kept the photos was to remind him that he failed to protect Aarti and say he is the guilty one. But Sonia leaves him and wishes him that Aarti may forgive him. Later on Avi attempts to kill himself in the same way his best friends did, but as a Polaroid camera clicks towards him, he sees Aarti sitting on his shoulders. Avi is suddenly thrown through the window, and ends up in the hospital, where it is revealed that the reason why she was sitting on his shoulders was that Aarti had still loved Avi.
As Sonia makes another photograph of Avi, she speaks to Aarti, asserting that one day she will let go as the reflection in the mirror shows Aarti still leaning on Avi's back.

Cast
 Shreyas Talpade as Avinash "Avi" Mehra
 Sadha Sayed as Sonia
 Sneha Ullal as Aarti Kaushik
 Rehan Khan		
 Chunky Pandey as Manu Sharma
 Jyoti Dogra		
 Avtar Gill as Ali bhai
 Riya Sen	 ...	Special Appearance
 Shishir Sharma as Aarti's father		
 Kavitta Verma

Soundtrack
The music was composed by Shamir Tandon and released by T-Series. All lyrics were penned by Shabbir Ahmed.

Box office
The film grossed .

References

External links
 Official website
 

2010s Hindi-language films
Indian supernatural horror films
2010s supernatural horror films
2010s ghost films
2010 films
Indian rape and revenge films
Indian horror film remakes
Indian remakes of Thai films
Films about suicide
Films set in India
Indian ghost films
Indian mystery films
Fiction about photography
Films directed by Sangeeth Sivan
Hindi-language horror films